Augustin de Saffray de Mésy (1598–1665) was the first Governor General of New France in 1663 after Louis XIV took over the administration of New France from the Compagnie des Cent-Associés.

Very little is known of de Mésy, but he served as town major in charge of the Château de Caen in Caen, Normandy. He developed a tense relationship with François de Laval during his tenure as Governor in Canada and died in office at Quebec on 6 May 1665.

External links 

 
 

Governors of New France
1665 deaths
Year of birth unknown
1598 births
17th-century Canadian politicians